New Right was a United Kingdom-based pan-European nationalist,  far-right think tank founded by Troy Southgate and Jonathan Bowden. It was part of the French Nouvelle Droite movement, and was otherwise unrelated to the wider British and American usage of the term "New Right". 

It was launched on 16 January 2005 at a meeting in central London.

As of March 2005, the group described itself via its Yahoo! Groups page as follows: "We are opposed to liberalism, democracy and egalitarianism and fight to restore the eternal values and principles that have become submerged beneath the corrosive tsunami of the modern world."

In June 2005, New Right announced that it would publish New Imperium, a quarterly magazine it described as an "intellectual journal".

References

Further reading 
 Graham D. Macklin, "Co-opting the counter culture: Troy Southgate and the National Revolutionary Faction", Patterns of Prejudice 39/3 (2005).

Far-right politics in the United Kingdom
New Right UK